Welcome Interstate Managers is the third studio album by the American rock band Fountains of Wayne. It was released by S-Curve Records on June 10, 2003. The album contains the power pop single "Stacy's Mom," which reached number 21 on the US Billboard Hot 100, becoming the band's highest-charting hit in the United States.

Background
Fountains of Wayne was at a low point following the under-performance of 1999's Utopia Parkway, which led to them getting dropped by their then-label, Atlantic Records. The period when they were without a label was particularly hard on lead singer and co-songwriter Chris Collingwood. According to bassist and co-songwriter Adam Schlesinger in 2005, "I think Chris felt especially bummed during that whole period. He just sort of felt that we worked for a really long time and it didn’t really add up to anything. And it didn’t seem like the future had much in the way of promise. Chris wasn’t writing a lot. I don’t know if it was the whole thing of being in between labels but more just the whole thing of putting all that time into it and feeling it tapering off."

Eventually Schlesinger convinced Collingwood to start writing and recording "because it was the only way that I could get Chris to want to be a part of it. I was just like, ‘Hey look, let’s just go in and do like we have always done when we were 18. If we have a song we like, we’ll just record it and eventually we’ll see if we have an album." By mid-2001, Fountains of Wayne had discussed plans for a new album.

Meanwhile, the band got in touch with several prospective labels, but balked at their insistence that the band record demos for consideration to be signed. According to Schlesinger, "We talked to a bunch of record companies before we had anything recorded. And everybody was like, ‘Well we really like your band but we need to hear what you’re working on. Do you have any demos or anything?’ And we didn't want to make demos. We just found that kind of demeaning. But we were sort of at the point where we could have gone and made demos. And it was like, you know, for God's sake we’ve been doing this so long, we’re not going to make a demo tape. We’re just gonna go make a record and that's what we did."

Recording
Fountains of Wayne commenced recording their new album without any label support. According to drummer Brian Young, "Adam put up the money to do the recording, we converged in a studio in upstate New York, and we didn’t know what to expect. We all showed up with basically nothing. I had a stick bag, and the engineer mentioned to me, 'You know, it would’ve been a lot cooler if you showed up with nothing at all.' We were kind of going through the studio basement, looking for gear and taping stands together. It was funny."

Once the album was finished, Fountains of Wayne signed to S-Curve Records, whose executive vice president, Steve Yegelwel, had first signed the band when he was working as an A&R at Atlantic Records. Prior to the album's release, the band went on tour in November 2002 to road test the new material and build up fan anticipation for the new record.

Release and reception

The album was met with commercial success and favorable reviews, citing the album's catchy song structures and well-crafted lyrics reflecting struggles of the middle class lifestyle in the American East Coast. The album is widely regarded as the band's best effort and a prime example of early 2000s power pop. Review aggregating website Metacritic reports a weighted average score of 86 out of 100 based on 24 reviews, indicating "universal acclaim".

The lead single "Stacy's Mom" was released on May 20, 2003 to popular and critical success.

"Valley Winter Song" was used in a 2008 L.L. Bean Commercial.

The album was first pressed to vinyl for Record Store Day Black Friday in a limited run in 2020.

Covers
In 2009, Katy Perry performed a cover of "Hackensack" on MTV Unplugged, which was later released digitally.

In 2011, the band The Wonder Years performed a cover of "Hey Julie" for the charity compilation album, Vs. the Earthquake.

Track listing

Personnel
Fountains of Wayne
Chris Collingwood – lead vocals and rhythm guitar, production
Jody Porter – lead guitar and backing vocals
Adam Schlesinger – bass guitar, synthesizers, lead and backing vocals, production, engineering, mixing on "Bright Future in Sales" and "No Better Place"
Brian Young – drums

Additional musicians
Ronnie Buttacavoli – trumpet on "Mexican Wine", flugelhorn on "Fire Island"
James Iha - guitar on "All Kinds of Time"
Robert Randolph - pedal steel on "Hung Up on You"
Jen Trynin - backing vocals and guitar on "No Better Place"

Technical personnel
Matt Beaudoin – assistant engineering
Collection of The New-York Historical Society – photography
Rudyard Lee Cullers – assistant engineering
Mike Denneen – production, engineering
Richard Furch – production, engineering
John Holbrook – mixing on all tracks, except where noted
Tom Lord-Alge – mixing on "Mexican Wine" and "Stacy's Mom"
George Marino – mastering
Frank Olinsky – art direction and design
Rafi Sofer – assistant engineering

Charts

References

External links

Welcome Interstate Managers at YouTube (streamed copy where licensed)

Fountains of Wayne albums
2003 albums
S-Curve Records albums
Virgin Records albums
Albums produced by Adam Schlesinger